Dracula in the Provinces is a 1975 Italian film directed by Lucio Fulci.

Plot 

Costante Nicosia is a boorish and irascible businessman having married for wealth. He is the new boss of a recently inherited toothpaste factory and the owner of a local Rome basketball team. Nicosia is abusive to his employees and his hunchbacked side-kick Peppino. Nicosia is also extremely superstitious. Peppino is less of a friend than a good luck charm as far as the insensitive Nicosia is concerned. He believes that it brings good luck to rub a hunchback's hump. In one day, a black cat crosses Nicosia's path, and he breaks a mirror in his apartment. Superstition demands that he persuade a virgin to urinate over the broken shards of glass to halt the tide of bad luck. Abusively, he passes a decrepit old spinster who lives next door to him. He mistakenly assumes that she has never done the "deed." Nicosia's relationship with his wife Mariu is scarcely more convivial, for he is also antagonistic towards her.

Reluctantly bowing to family pressure, Nicosia employs his loafing brother-in-law to the factory's menial post. But he fires him the following day after catching the man asleep on the job, snoring loudly. That evening at a family gathering at his apartment, he is accosted by his ungrateful in-laws who try to shame him into giving the feckless man his job back. Instead of acquiescing to family practice, he bursts into an escalating tirade of rudeness against the singer's figure of his Great Aunt Maria. The old woman finally responds to his cynical remarks by uttering a curse. Nicosia dismisses her at first, that is until the old woman threatens to pour oil onto the floor; this heavy-duty bit of magical business breaks Nicosia's nerve, and he recants in a babbling panic. Nicosia grovels for the curse to be lifted, and the old woman refuses to do so.

A few days later, Nicosia is on a plane to Bucharest, Romania, where he expects to attend a business conference. A man seated nearby introduces himself as Count Dragalescu. After some small talk, he invites the troubled industrialist to visit him at his castle. Upon arriving at the hotel, Nicosia discovers that the conference has been postponed, leaving him stranded for the entire weekend. Another businessman, named Meniconi, tells him that there are no prostitutes in the region and that he has failed to seduce any of the local women. He confides to Nicosia that he has taken to wearing the lingerie, brand named "Hot Night in Havana", himself. Rather than spend the weekend in the hotel, Nicosia decides to call on the Count.

Upon arriving, Nicosia sees that the castle is very much what one would expect from a Romanian nobleman's abode, complete with lighting and thunder to amplify the Gothic effect. Count Dragalescu greets his guest in the cavernous dining hall. Suddenly, a group of revelers staggers down the large staircase into the dining hall. The Count introduces his companions (three women and a man) to the wary guest. The women greet Nicosia in a lavish, tactile manner. When Boris, the screaming camp male of the party, tries to greet Nicosia too, he backs up nervously away and declines. Laughing, the Count sends Nicosia up to his room to prepare for dinner.

A little later, when Nicosia comes back down the stairs, well dressed in a tuxedo, he finds himself overdressed for the occasion. Very awkwardly, Nicosia sits down at the dinner table near a naked Count Dragalescu and his bevy of naked women. The evening gets even more debauched when Nicosia has a little too much to drink, strips off all his clothes, cavorts with the three nude women of the assembled throng, and then passes out cold. The next morning, he wakes up in his bed with the mirthfully grinning Dragalescu lying next to him. The half-dressed Nicosia runs in horror from the castle and catches the first plane back to Italy.

Back in Italy and working at his toothpaste company, Nicosia is rather tense and uptight. He greets all his employees who speak to him with a clenched and furious tone. While overseeing his basketball team at practice, he is knocked off balance when the coach tells the team, "you've got the big one!" Nicosia repeats the phrase "big one" over and over again and then collapses in the locker room when he sees a row of naked men's bottoms in the showers.

Nicosia goes to his physician Dr. Paluzzi, who suggests that he try making out with his mistress, and if he cannot do that, the doctor adds that he must have been "deflowered while drunk." However, this attempt to re-establish his heterosexuality fails because the tormented Nicosia feels compelled to bite her with and suck blood out of her neck.

Even more stricken, first with anxiety and then with abject self-pity, Nicosia calls on his Great Aunt Maria to beg her to remove the curse which, he assumes, is responsible for his misfortune of homosexuality and blood craving. However, she claims that she had nothing to do with his urge for blood. She recommends that he visit the Magician of Noto in Sicily for help, and he complies in desperation. Upon arriving at the Magician of Noto's residence, Nicosia clearly sees that the magician is a fake from the posture and tone of voice. But Nicosia accepts his advice: the curse on him will be lifted only if he re-hires his brother-in-law. Nicosia leaves, where it is revealed to the viewers that the whole thing was a deliberate stunt organized by his in-laws into tricking Nicosia into giving his brother-in-law his job back. Returning home far from being cured, he responds to his needy wife's sexual advances by plunging his fang-like teeth into her bare bottom during foreplay.

Over the next several months, Nicosia adopts devil-may-care aggression; he re-fires his lazy brother-in-law, arranges to visit prostitutes to satisfy his urge to bite, and isolates himself from family and friends. Finally, he satiates his craving by setting up a blood bank at his factory site and compelling all employees to attend. Just as he seems to have surrendered to total cynicism, his wife arrives at the factory with a baby, his newborn son that was conceived that night of their passion. Rejoicing at his proof of his potency, Nicosia throws off the shackles of his paranoia and goes to greet and hold his baby son, only to discover in the final shot that the baby sports a protruding pair of fangs.

Cast 
Lando Buzzanca: Cav. Costante Nicosia
John Steiner: Count Dragulescu 
Moira Orfei: Bestia Assatanata 
Christa Linder: Liù Pederzoli
Sylva Koscina: Mariù, wife of Costante 
Ciccio Ingrassia: Salvatore, the "Wizard of Noto"
Valentina Cortese: Olghina Franchetti
Francesca Romana Coluzzi: Wanda Torsello
Rossano Brazzi: Dr. Paluzzi
Carlo Bagno: Head Worker 
Ilona Staller: Gianka
Antonio Allocca: Peppino

Production
Right after principal shooting for Four of the Apocalypse was complete, director Lucio Fulci began working on a new comedy film the vein of Mel Brooks' Young Frankenstein. The film's screenplay included the comedy screenwriting team of Bruno Corbucci and Mario Amendola as well as Pupi Avati. Fulci has stated that Avati's contribution to the screenplay was only a few pages, specifically the trip to Romania, but not the trip to the night club. The dialogue in the film was revised to make it more spontaneous by Enzo Jannacci and Giuseppe Viola.

The film was shot in eight weeks between March and April 1975.

Release
Dracula in the Provinces was distributed theatrically in Italy by Titanus on 31 August 1975. The film grossed a total of 940,484,803 Italian lire domestically on its initial theatrical release. Italian film historian and critic Roberto Curti noted that the film did "not do as well as expected" in the Italian box office. Fulci would declare it among his favorite films he directed.

The film was released with the English-language titles Young Dracula and Dracula in the Provinces.

References

Footnotes

Sources

External links

1975 films
1975 LGBT-related films
1970s comedy horror films
Films directed by Lucio Fulci
Italian comedy horror films
Italian vampire films
Vampire comedy films
Italian satirical films
Films scored by Fabio Frizzi
1975 comedy films
Films set in Lombardy
1970s Italian-language films
1970s Italian films